Great Leap Brewing operates four brewpubs in Beijing, two in the Dongcheng District and two in the Chaoyang District. It makes and sells a wide range of beers at those locations, popular both with the city's Western expatriate community and younger Chinese drinkers interested in an alternative product.

When it opened in 2010, it was the first microbrewery in Beijing to specialize in craft beers with Chinese ingredients, and the longest-tenured one currently brewing. Founder Carl Setzer and Dane Vanden Berg, another American expatriate working for an information technology company in Beijing at the time, were frustrated by the narrow choice of beers available in the city. With Liu Fang, Setzer's Chinese wife, they began brewing their own in a former siheyuan on a hutong in the city's Nanluoguxiang neighborhood. That location, still open, has been described as "one of the most difficult bars to find in Beijing."

Eventually, it expanded to two other locations and began offering a range of up to 40 beers at different times of year, with an infusion of venture capital. Setzer left his job to run Great Leap full-time in 2011. 

The brewery has focused on using Chinese ingredients in its beers, including Sichuan pepper and Tieguanyin oolong tea, and branding that draws on Chinese history and culture, in a successful effort to attract Chinese consumers looking for an alternative to the country's national brands.

History

2004–2009: Prehistory
 
Carl Setzer, a native of Cleveland, Ohio, first came to China in 2004 after graduating from college in Alabama, at the behest of some fellow graduates doing missionary work there. He worked at Dongfeng Motor, the country's leading truck manufacturer, in the Hubei city of Shiyan, for a year. There he met and befriended Liu Fang, a Shandong native, before returning to the U.S. for graduate study at the University of Pittsburgh, after which he went to work in Taiwan.  

In 2008, he returned to China, setting up the Beijing office of an American information technology firm. Setzer, who had not been much of a drinker until the previous year due to a family history of alcoholism and a religious education, was disappointed with China's national beer brands like Tsingtao. He often complained about them to Dane Vandenberg, a fellow employee back in the U.S. The two realized that Beijing was an ideal market for a microbrewery, much like those that had sprung up in Setzer's native region of Northeast Ohio. "Never let a market that has a requirement go unsupplied," Setzer told CNN later.

Within six months of his return to China, Setzer and Liu got married. The couple traveled to Belgium and the Netherlands, where visits to local breweries helped Liu realize that all beer did not have to taste the same. Back in China, Setzer, whose German great-grandfather had worked at a brewery in Frankfurt, began learning how to make beer, while Vanden Berg, in California, raised money from investors.

Craft beers were not unknown in China at that time. Brewpubs were already in operation in Shanghai and Hong Kong. In Beijing itself, there had been some brewpubs and German-style beer halls operated by Munich-based Paulaner Brewery since the early 1990s that catered both to expatriates and to Chinese made prosperous by free-market economic reforms that began at the time. But there was nothing like the craft breweries that had sprung up in the U.S. since the 1980s, "places where you knew the service was always going to be great, where the stuff was always going to be on draft," Setzer said later.

The three found an old siheyuan, or courtyard house, on Doujiao Hutong, a narrow side street in central Beijing's Dongcheng District near the Nanluoguxiang area, with many other bars popular with the city's Western expatriate community, and the Bell and Drum Towers, an area popular with younger Beijingers. They began remodeling the turn-of-the-century library, part of a Qing Dynasty mansion, for use as a brewpub, keeping the decor to a minimum in order to concentrate on the beer and send that same message to customers. "We did this with not particularly high expectations, without a lot of economic motivation", Setzer told All About Beer in 2012.

Accounts of how the brewery got its name differ. Vandenberg says he came up with the name "Great Leap" for the risk he and Setzer were taking. However, a 2016 article reported that Liu's grandfather suggested it. The name carries connotations of strength in Chinese. Great Leap's website cites a Song Dynasty poem by Chén Shùnyú, "Bull Riding Song", which the brewery translates as "to take a great leap when you are young and fat," differing somewhat from the actual meaning, but nonetheless evoking the courage the founders displayed in starting it. Additionally, the name contains the same characters as the Maoist Great Leap Forward campaign.

2010: Opening

In October 2010, Setzer decided to open the brewery, financing it with $17,000 in savings. He hosted a party at the siheyuan, inviting a fellow American attending the Inter-University Program for Chinese Language Study, at Tsinghua University, whom he had shown the beer to as he brewed it, to come down and try it. The friend invited his roommate, who informed his friends about the party and very soon, an event intended for just a few people was hosting 60 students coming down from Wudaokou. 

Using ingredients and equipment sourced domestically in order to reduce operating costs, he brewed on Sundays and opened for only the three days before that, serving from nine  kegs, which he recalled later seemed like a large amount at the time. The company offered four beers—Pale Ale #6, named for the building's street address; Oatmeal Porter, Cinnamon Rock Candy Ale and Honey Ma Blonde. The latter two used distinctly Chinese flavoring adjuncts to make up for the paucity of Chinese malt varieties: large-bark cinnamon in the former, and a combination of Sichuan pepper and honey from a Shandong apiary run by relatives of Liu's.

Patrons could consume their beer on premises in  pint glasses, for which they were charged  depending on the variety. They could also take it home in liter-sized growlers for ¥60–80, or bottles with a ¥30 deposit. All prices were slightly higher than those charged for Chinese national brands at the time. The only food available was spicy peanuts and (sometimes) dried malts; there was no prepared food.

A particular early area of concern for Great Leap was relations with the neighbors in its out-of-the-way residential area. "Strangers in hutongs are never welcome," according to Setzer. To prevent noise complaints, the brewpub closed no later than midnight, and even earlier in summer and during university exam periods.

At first, as Setzer had expected, the clientele was almost exclusively Westerners. Staff at the American and British embassies were early regulars and strong supporters. Initial reviews were positive. "The simple fact is that this place has no gimmicks or frills," wrote the English-language China Daily near the end of the year. "[I]t makes some of the best beer in town."

City Weekend, a newspaper for expats, also gave Great Leap publicity, thanks to an intern who had attended the opening weekend. This in turn came to the notice of journalist James Fallows, who had recently returned to the U.S. after several years of reporting from China. In his blog for The Atlantic, where he had often complained about the poor quality of beer in not just China but Asia as a whole, he promised readers he would be on the next flight back to Beijing to try some of Great Leap's offerings. The existence of beer flavored with Sichuan peppercorn in particular excited him. "With that in beer, I suppose I'll never again be able to complain about bland Chinese beers."

2011: Success and challenges

In January 2011, Setzer quit his job to work at the brewery full-time. "Everyone around me told me I was crazy," he recalled to USA Today later in the year. That spring Vanden Berg came to China to take a more active role in the business. The warming weather improved business as patrons could sit outside. Enough other bar owners came by asking if they could sell the beer that Setzer decided it was time to get into distribution. Sales were so strong that by the summer Great Leap was converting a farmhouse in Tianxianlu, near the Mutianyu section of the Great Wall, into a brewery, using equipment better suited to large-scale industrial production, to meet demand. 

As Setzer had hoped, younger Chinese drinkers, many of whom had been introduced to craft beers abroad, were joining the expatriates as customers. By July they were making up 70% of the brewery's customer base. "Some come, they think, 'That's a bit weird,' and leave after one drink," Liu said. "But then they come back the next day, the next week, and bring their friends, too." She observed that, among younger Chinese, the longstanding tradition of consuming alcoholic beverages only in the form of grain-based spirits with meals seemed to be changing thanks to the introduction of beers like Great Leap's.

Setzer continued to expand the available beers, introducing a new one each month on a seasonal basis, and making it a permanent offering if it did well, like a chocolate cardamom stout. "I want to do ever-crazier beers," he said to USA Today. "There are so many different spices and flavors in Chinese cuisine that have not been defined chemically yet."

One of those beers was Iron Buddha Blonde, which uses oolong tea, an ingredient Setzer says is particularly well-suited to use in brewing, as an adjunct. "[It] gives the beer a floral note at the end," he explained. The name was a play on the name of the tea variety used, tiě guānyīn (铁观音), which means "iron goddess of mercy."

At the other end of the scale was his Little General IPA, a beer in a style Setzer had not originally planned to make but produced in response to customers' demand for one. As a "purity" beer with only those ingredients allowed by the German Reinheitsgebot (malted barley, hops yeast and water), it had no special flavoring ingredients. But its name came from Zhang Xueliang, a patriotic hero in China and Taiwan. In the late 1930s he kidnapped Chiang Kai-shek, persuaded him to ally his Kuomintang with the Communist forces against the Japanese, then surrendered to Chiang's forces after the kidnapping, to be exiled to Hawaii where he died in 2001 without ever returning to either China or Taiwan.

"We take pride in the recipes, names and stories of our products and so far our Chinese customers also take a lot of pride in that," he said later. He noted in 2015 that the beers with Chinese names and ingredients are the most popular with Chinese customers, a phenomenon he likened to the way American craft beer had taken off when brewers started to use American ingredients rather than importing traditionally used hops and grains from Europe.

Late in the year Great Leap faced its biggest challenge. Due to fallout from some of China's food safety scandals, authority for granting licenses to distribute food and drink was moved from the China Food and Drug Administration, where the brewery's application had been pending, to the General Administration of Quality Supervision, Inspection and Quarantine. The new agency gave Setzer the choice of either expediting the license for the original brewpubs, or taking the chance on the full distribution license, but with likely dire consequences if Great Leap's beer was found to be unsafe. At one point he was threatened with deportation and Liu with jail. (Setzer believes the real issue was that their product wound up outselling Guinness at an Irish bar, which led them to stop that distribution model for a while)

It could have been possible to avoid that dilemma and still distribute the beer covertly. "There are always ways to lie in Beijing, some bottled water manufacturer who can tuck your beer under his bottles and distribute it for you," Setzer said a year later. "But that's not the fugitive life I want for my wife and kid ... Did I leave a six-figure corporate job to be a bartender, or did I leave to build a brand and a future for beer culture in Beijing?" He chose the latter, and just before Chinese New Year in 2012 was informed at a dinner with officials that they had been impressed with the brewery's cleanliness and would be granting the license. The company prepared to increase its output drastically, to 15,000 hectoliters. It made plans to open a second location on Xinzhong Street in the Dongzhimen neighborhood a little further from central Beijing, but more accessible.

2012–present: Third location

In June 2013 it opened a second location on Xinzhong Street in the Dongzhimen neighborhood a little further from central Beijing, but more accessible. For that year the company grossed $225,000, of which only a quarter went to operating costs. "I'm living the American dream, just not in America," Setzer observed. The company collaborated with Boxing Cat, a Shanghai craft brewery, to produce Yunnan Amber Ale, which tops off the three different malt and hops varieties each it uses with dianhong black tea from the titular province.

In 2015 the company opened its third location, in Sanlitun, an area of the Chaoyang District near the U.S. embassy popular for its nightlife. With the three locations, Setzer had said in 2014 that he expected to be selling a million pints annually. "We're never really satisfied until Great Leap gets to the point that it's available to as many people as possible," he said. "Three strong retail locations in Beijing may accomplish this." A partnership with Germany's Drei Kronen was also expected to help.

Facilities

Great Leap has four retail outlets at which its beers can be purchased for consumption on or off premises. The oldest, the company's original location, is on Doujiao Hutong in the Dongcheng District near the Bell and Drum Tower and south of the Nanluoguxiang neighborhood. It is a renovated siheyuan, or courtyard house, built to serve as a private library during the final years of the Qing dynasty at the beginning of the 20th century. Beers may be consumed either at the bar or in the courtyard surrounded by high stone walls. Spiced peanuts are given out for free as snacks; patrons may order food delivered from other restaurants in the area.

The original location has also been noted for its seclusion and the challenge of getting there. The Lonely Planet guidebooks describe it as "a hidden gem to beat all hidden gems." Moon's Living Abroad in Beijing strongly suggests reviewing the map from Great Leap's website before visiting for the first time, Wikivoyage calls it "[q]uite possibly the most difficult bar to find in Beijing", and All About Beer describes the trip there from central Beijing as "a distinctly Chinese affair" likely involving having to ask a local for directions.

Three other brewpubs are located further to the east, keeping later hours as they are not located in residential areas. Beyond the Second Ring Road but still in Dongcheng, in the Dongzhimen area, is the company's second location on Xinzhong Street. It has more of the features of a typical bar and serves more food. It was Great Leap's first location to have a full-service kitchen, serving cheeseburgers, sandwiches and salads in addition to a fuller array of bar snacks. 
The Sanlitun brewpub, close to the U.S. embassy in the Chaoyang District, is at  the largest such facility in mainland China. It has three  fermentation tanks, producing Great Leap's three best-selling brands: Honey Ma, Pale #6 and Banana Wheat (others are also on tap. The kitchen here specializes in New York-style pizza.

A fourth Great Leap location, GLB LIDO - a thirty tap taproom - opened December 2018 at the Nuo Center, Jingtai Road, Chaoyang.

In June 2019, Great Leap began production at its brand new 500,000hL per annum capacity brewery in the Xiqing Development Zone, Tianjin. It is one of the biggest craft breweries in Asia.

Beers

Great Leap's product range includes 40 beers, of which 12 are on tap in its facilities at any given time, with many varieties produced on a seasonal or rotating basis. All use a variation on the main Great Leap logo, with a graphic on top, Chinese name in large traditional characters in the middle with English below, and circles of varying sizes with the hanzi for "great" and "leap", the latter in its simplified version, flanking a larger one with a monogrammed "GLB" and smaller circles with symbols representing hops and a turret on the Great Wall of China, the latter the location of the company's offsite brewing facility. The English uses a typeface specifically designed for Great Leap's branding. Color schemes vary.

Since the company's name also alludes to the Great Leap Forward, an ill-fated economic development program launched by Mao Zedong in the mid-20th century, it drew on that period of modern Chinese history as inspiration for part of its logo. At the top, a fist raises a mug, in gold on a red background—the colors of the Chinese flag. The fist is a "symbol of power and potential" derived from Chinese propaganda posters of the late 1950s, during the Great Leap.

Beers include:

#6 Pale Ale, named for the street address of the original Doujiao Hutong location.
Banana Wheat, one of the top sellers.
Cinnamon Rock Ale, using large-bark cinnamon rock candy as an adjunct.
East City Porter.
Honey Ma Gold, featuring Sichuan pepper as a flavoring adjunct, offset by honey from Shandong. Setzer said in 2015 that this is Great Leap's bestselling beer "by a very large margin".
Imperial Pumpkin, produced every fall
Iron Buddha Blonde, using Tieguanyin oolong tea as an adjunct, giving a floral finish to the taste.
Little General IPA, a "purity law" beer named for Zhang Xueliang.
Liu the Brave Stout, named for Liu's late father. The graphic is based on the one surviving picture of him.

See also

Beer in China
List of companies of China

References

External links

Official website

Chinese beer brands
Breweries in China
Food and drink companies based in Beijing
Chinese companies established in 2010
Dongcheng District, Beijing